SPECTRE (Special Executive for Counter-intelligence, Terrorism, Revenge and Extortion) is a fictional organisation featured in the James Bond novels by Ian Fleming, as well as the films and video games based on those novels. Led by criminal mastermind Ernst Stavro Blofeld, the international organisation first formally appeared in the novel Thunderball (1961) and in the film Dr. No (1962). SPECTRE is not aligned with any nation or political ideology, enabling the later Bond books and Bond films to be regarded as somewhat apolitical. The presence of former Gestapo members in the organisation though can be considered as a sign of Fleming's warnings about Nazi fugitives after the Second World War, as first detailed in the novel Moonraker (1954). In the novels, SPECTRE begins as a small group of criminals but in the films, it is depicted as a vast international organisation with its own SPECTRE Island training base capable of replacing the Soviet SMERSH.

Philosophy and goals

In the novels, SPECTRE, is a commercial enterprise led by Blofeld. The top level of the organisation is made up of twenty-one individuals, eighteen of whom handle day-to-day affairs. Members are drawn in groups of three from six of the world's most notorious organisations—the Nazi German Gestapo, the Soviet SMERSH, Yugoslav Marshal Josip Broz Tito's OZNA, the Italian Mafia, the French-Corsican Unione Corse, and KRYSTAL, a massive Turkish heroin-smuggling operation. Coincidentally, the three from KRYSTAL are all formerly of RAHIR, an intelligence agency previously run by Blofeld. The remaining three members are Blofeld himself and two scientific/technical experts who make their debut in the ninth Bond novel, Thunderball (1961). When Fleming was writing the novel in 1959, he believed that the Cold War might end during the two years it would take to produce the film, and came to the conclusion that the inclusion of a contemporary political villain would leave the film looking dated. Therefore, he thought it better to create a politically neutral enemy for Bond. Fleming's SPECTRE has elements inspired by mafia syndicates and organised crime rings that were actively hunted by law enforcement in the 1950s. The strict codes of loyalty and silence, and the hard retributions that followed violations, were hallmarks of American gangster rings, the Italian Mafia, the Unione Corse, the Chinese Tongs and Triads, and the Japanese Yakuza and Black Dragon Society. During the events of Thunderball, SPECTRE successfully hijacked two nuclear warheads for ransom.

The organisation is next mentioned in the tenth novel, The Spy Who Loved Me (1962), when Bond describes investigating their activities in Toronto before the story begins, though they play no part in the story itself. The organisation's third appearance is in the eleventh novel, On Her Majesty's Secret Service (1963) where Blofeld, hired by an unnamed country or party—though the Soviet Union is implied—is executing a plan to ruin British agriculture with biological warfare. Blofeld, with a weakened SPECTRE, would appear for the final time in the twelfth novel, You Only Live Twice (1964). By this point, the organisation has largely been shut down, and what remains is focused on maintaining Blofeld's alias as Dr. Guntram von Shatterhand and his compound in Japan.

In the films, the organisation often acts as a third party in the ongoing Cold War. Their objectives have ranged from supporting Dr. Julius No in sabotaging American rocket launches, holding the world to ransom, and demanding clemency from governments for their previous crimes. The goal of world domination was only ever stated in You Only Live Twice when SPECTRE was working on behalf of an unnamed Asian government. This is strongly implied to be Red China, who earlier backed Auric Goldfinger in the film of the same name.

Its long-term strategy, however, is illustrated by the analogy of the three Siamese fighting fish Blofeld keeps in an aquarium aboard SPECTRE's yacht in the film version of From Russia with Love. Blofeld notes that one fish is refraining from fighting two others until their fight is concluded. Then, that cunning fish attacks the weakened victor and kills it easily. Thus SPECTRE's main strategy is to instigate conflict between two powerful enemies, namely the superpowers, hoping that they will exhaust themselves and be vulnerable when it seizes power. SPECTRE thus works with, and against, both sides of the Cold War. For example, in the film Thunderball, it simultaneously blackmails a Japanese double agent, distributes Red Chinese narcotics in the United States, kills a defector to the USSR on behalf of the French Foreign Ministry, and threatens NATO with stolen nuclear weapons, while continuing ordinary criminal operations such as advising on the British Great Train Robbery.

In both the film and the novel Thunderball, the physical headquarters of the organisation are in Paris, operating behind a front organisation aiding refugees named "Firco" (Fraternité Internationale de la Résistance Contre l’Oppression) in the novels and "International Brotherhood for the Assistance of Stateless Persons" in the films). Organisational discipline is notoriously draconian, with the penalty for disobedience or failure being death. To heighten the impact of executions, Blofeld had been known to focus attention on an innocent member, making it appear his death is imminent, only to suddenly strike down the actual target when that person is off guard.

Leadership
SPECTRE is headed by the criminal mastermind Ernst Stavro Blofeld who usually appears accompanied by a Chinchilla Silver Persian cat in the films, but not in the books. In both the films and the novels, Emilio Largo is the second in command. It is stated in the novel that if something were to happen to Blofeld, Largo would assume command. Largo appears in the 1961 novel Thunderball, the 1965 film version and its 1983 remake, Never Say Never Again, where he is renamed Maximilian Largo and is said to be Romanian rather than Italian.

The SPECTRE cabinet had a total of twenty-one members. Blofeld was the chairman and leader because he founded the organisation and Largo was elected by the cabinet to be second in command. A physicist named Kotze (who later defected) and an electronics expert named Maslov were also included in the group for their expertise on scientific and technical matters.

Members are typically referred to by number rather than by name. In the novels, the numbers were initially assigned at random and then rotated up by two digits on a once-a-month basis to prevent detection; for example, if a SPECTRE operative is titled 'Number 1' in the present month, the security system will designate them 'Number 3' in the next month, 'Number 5' in the following month and so forth. However, in the EON films the number indicates rank within the organisation: Blofeld is always referred to as 'Number 1' and Emilio Largo, in Thunderball, is 'Number 2'. This particular example of numbering is perhaps deliberately borrowed from revolutionary organisations, where members exist in cells, and are numerically defined to prevent identification and cross-betrayal of aims. By deliberately drawing attention away from the true leader of the organisation, he is protected by masquerading as a target of lower importance, and the structure of the organisation is also obscured from intelligence services.

Members who fail missions are immediately executed, usually in gory and spectacular ways. In the novel, Blofeld electrocutes one member in his chair for sexually molesting a girl who had been kidnapped by the organization; he had previously strangled a second to death with a garrote and shot a third through the heart with a compressed-air pistol. In the film, Number 9 is electrocuted for embezzlement at the Thunderball meeting where he and Number 11 report on the proceeds from a narcotics-related operation; the execution terrifies other high-ranking SPECTRE agents. The merciless killing of assistant Helga Brandt in You Only Live Twice, for failing to kill James Bond, similarly horrifies visiting Red Chinese agents; she is thrown into Blofeld's Piranha pool and dies in terror as she gets eaten. Previously, in From Russia with Love, Kronsteen was killed with a poisoned shoe knife in front of Rose Klebb to motivate Klebb to complete her mission with no further delays. As an added layer of terror, Blofeld prefers to threaten an "innocent" operative only to execute his true victim at the last possible moment, making the execution even more terrifying to witnesses and emphasizing his demands for loyalty and efficiency.

Appearances

Novels
In the original Bond novel series, SPECTRE's first and last appearance as a worldwide power is in the novel Thunderball. In it, SPECTRE attempts to conduct nuclear blackmail against NATO. Apparently disbanded afterwards, SPECTRE is said to be active again in the next book, The Spy Who Loved Me, although the organisation is not involved in the plot. In On Her Majesty's Secret Service, the second chapter of what is known as the "Blofeld Trilogy", Blofeld has revived SPECTRE where he attempts to carry out biological warfare against the United Kingdom. Blofeld's final appearance is in You Only Live Twice, where SPECTRE has largely disbanded.

Later, the John Gardner Bond novel, For Special Services introduces a revived SPECTRE led by Blofeld's daughter, Nena Bismaquer. Although Bond ultimately prevents SPECTRE from reforming, the organization continues under the leadership of Tamil Rahani to play a part in Role of Honour and Nobody Lives for Ever. The next Bond novelist, Raymond Benson, reintroduces Irma Bunt, Blofeld's assistant, in his short story "Blast From the Past", which is a sequel to You Only Live Twice.

Films

In the EON Productions's James Bond series, which began in 1962 with Dr. No, SPECTRE plays a more prominent role. The organisation is mentioned as being affiliated with Dr. No, although the main organisation in the movie is No's personal army. In the novel, Dr. No worked for the USSR. In the films, SPECTRE usually replaced SMERSH as the main villain, although there is a brief reference to SMERSH in the second EON Bond film, From Russia with Love (1963). The film adaptation of From Russia with Love also features the first on-screen appearance of Blofeld, although he is only identified by name in the closing credits of the film and his face is not seen at all. SPECTRE also serves as the primary antagonist of the film, orchestrating a plan to humiliate and kill James Bond as revenge for the death of Dr. No.

After being absent from the third film, Goldfinger (1964), SPECTRE returns in the fourth film, Thunderball (1965), which closely mirrors the events of the novel, and subsequently is featured in the following films. During the events of the fifth film, You Only Live Twice (1967), they attempt to incite a war between the United States and Soviet Union. In film number six, On Her Majesty's Secret Service (1969), Blofeld develops a biological warfare program and plans to demand clemency and recognition of a claimed title of nobility. SPECTRE's final appearance is in the seventh film, Diamonds Are Forever (1971), where they attempt to forcibly disarm the Cold War powers. SPECTRE was dismantled for good after Diamonds Are Forever. Following Diamonds Are Forever, SPECTRE and Blofeld were retired from the EON Films series, except for a cameo by a character implied to be Blofeld in For Your Eyes Only (1981) in which said character is killed. Partly owing to a copyright dispute between rival Bond producers Albert R. Broccoli and Kevin McClory, the character is never referred to by name and is credited as "Wheelchair Villain", though the closed captions for the film later refer to him as Blofeld.

Rebooted Continuity

The organisation returns in the rebooted Daniel Craig series of Bond films, which are set in an entirely separate universe to the earlier movies. In the 2015 film Spectre, the eponymous committee is simply referred to by that title. In the film, Bond is posthumously sent by Judi Dench's M to assassinate Marco Sciarra, which in turn leads him on the trail of the organisation. It is revealed throughout the course of the film that SPECTRE, and in turn Ernst Stavro Blofeld, have been the power behind the previous Craig villains; the Quantum organisation from Casino Royale and  2008's Quantum of Solace is revealed to be a subsidiary of SPECTRE, while Raoul Silva from Skyfall is shown to be affiliated with the organisation as well. In addition to Silva, Le Chiffre, Mr. White, and Dominic Greene are all revealed to have a direct connection to SPECTRE. 

Using SPECTRE, Blofeld attempts to gain control of a global surveillance program called Nine Eyes. Bond, M, and Q manage to stop them and Blofeld is captured by MI6 and sent to prison for his crimes. It's revealed Bond was adopted by Blofeld's father after Bond was orphaned at a young age, making Blofeld resent him as he believed he was stealing his family's love and replacing him.  After killing his father, Blofeld faked his death and went into hiding, helping build the SPECTRE organization that would extend into crime and political manipulation to fuel his desire to become better than Bond, even taking credit in helping destroy his life before and during the films, though how much of this is true is unknown.

This iteration of SPECTRE, returns in the 2021 film No Time to Die, where they remain at large despite Blofeld's imprisonment and attempt to assassinate James Bond in Matera. Five years later, the organization kidnaps Russian-turned-MI6 scientist Valdo Obruchev and the nanobot-bioweapon codenamed "Project Heracles", a superweapon meant to kill targets through their DNA by physical interaction of those infected with the nanobots. Every high- and mid-level ranking SPECTRE member meets in Cuba, and it is revealed that Blofeld is still in control of the organization by a mechanical eye, despite being imprisoned in Britain. James Bond sneaks in to the meeting and is ordered to be killed by the nanobots by Blofeld, but Obruchev secretly had the DNA changed from Bond to every SPECTRE member and anyone related to them, killing every SPECTRE member at the meeting. The main antagonist of the film, Lyutsifer Safin, is a victim of SPECTRE who seeks revenge against the organization after they brought about the death of his family, who served SPECTRE as poison specialists. As the bioweapon kills SPECTRE members and their relatives around the world, the organization is dismantled and destroyed. With Blofeld as the last surviving member of the organization, Safin blackmails Madeleine Swann into infecting Blofeld with Heracles. Swann backs out after she unintentionally infects Bond, but the mission is a success when Bond attacks Blofeld, who is infected and dies. Though Safin's revenge is successful in wiping out the entirety of SPECTRE's leadership, low-level agents are implied to still to be at large, and he even welcomes one low-level member, Primo, to join his cause. Despite this, SPECTRE is no longer a threat to the world due to the loss of their political power and leadership.

Non-EON film appearances
In 1983 Warner Bros. released Never Say Never Again starring Sean Connery, based on the same original source material as Thunderball. The film retells the basic story of Thunderball, albeit with some new characters and in an updated setting. It also reintroduces both SPECTRE and Blofeld.

Video games
SPECTRE is shown but never mentioned by name,in the game GoldenEye: Rogue Agent. Instead, it is referred to as a "powerful criminal organisation." It is depicted as being much more powerful than it was in any of the films or books, possessing a massive undersea black market known as "The Octopus", a large lair built into an extinct volcano and resembling Karl Stromberg's Atlantis lair from The Spy Who Loved Me. There are also the personal structures of its members such as Auric Goldfinger's Auric Enterprises facility and casino and Dr. No's Crab Key. SPECTRE also possesses extremely advanced technology, such as virtual reality and energy generators in its volcano lair.

Although the From Russia with Love video game mirrors much of the plot of the eponymous film, it uses an organisation called OCTOPUS rather than SPECTRE to avoid copyright issues.

Comics
A version of SPECTRE similar to the novels was featured in the comic strips published in the Daily Express newspaper between 1958 and 1983. The organisation however didn't appear in the comic books until Eidolon, a miniseries published by Dynamite Entertainment in 2016, written by Warren Ellis and illustrated by Jason Masters. In this comic, SPECTRE has a World War II organisation that is mostly defunct. Loyalists endured as plants and sleeper agents in the aftermath of a Warsaw Pact surge, waiting for the right moment for SPECTRE to have a reformation and resurgence.

Copyright issues

SPECTRE and its characters were at the centre of long-standing litigation between Kevin McClory and Ian Fleming over the film rights to Thunderball and the ownership of the organisation and its characters. In 1963, Fleming settled out of court with McClory, giving him the film rights to Thunderball; the literary rights stayed with Fleming and thus allowed continuation author John Gardner to use SPECTRE in a number of his novels.

In 1963, EON Productions producers Albert R. Broccoli and Harry Saltzman made an agreement with McClory to adapt the novel into the fourth James Bond film, also stipulating that McClory would not be allowed to make further adaptations of Thunderball for at least ten years after the release. Although SPECTRE and Blofeld were used in a number of films before and after Thunderball, the issue over the copyright of Thunderball prevented SPECTRE and Blofeld from becoming the main villains in 1977's The Spy Who Loved Me. In 1983, McClory released a film based on his Bond rights entitled Never Say Never Again.

In 1998, MGM/UA took legal action against Sony and McClory in the United States to prevent Warhead 2000 AD from going into production. MGM/UA abandoned the claim after settling with Sony. McClory's Bond rights, including his rights in SPECTRE, were unaffected.

On 15 November 2013, MGM and the McClory estate announced that they had formally settled the issue with Danjaq, LLC and MGM had acquired the full copyright to the characters and concepts of Blofeld and SPECTRE. Having lost its mantle of acronym, now simply called Spectre, the organisation and Blofeld were the main antagonists in the first Bond film released after the settlement, Spectre.

SPECTRE henchmen

Henchmen working for SPECTRE, one of its members, or directly for Ernst Stavro Blofeld:

Novels
 Emilio Largo – Second in command of SPECTRE and designated by Blofeld to oversee all field operations for Thunderball; killed by Domino Vitali
 "Giuseppe Petacchi" – A man surgically altered to look like Domino Vitali's brother; kills the crew aboard the NATO test flight carrying the bombs and flies it to rendezvous with SPECTRE, only to be killed upon delivery.
 Vargas – The assassin who kills Petacchi
 Fonda – "Number 4", an Italian Artiq who recruited Petacchi for the plot
 Pierre Borraud – "Number 12", of the Unione Corse; had sex with a girl that he kidnapped for ransom. As a punishment, Blofeld electrocuted Borraud and returned half of the ransom money to the girl's father as compensation. While Blofeld considered the possibility that the sexual relationship was consensual, it was more important that SPECTRE was reputed to keep its word.
 Marius Domingue – "Number 7", another Unione Corse man; highly trustworthy, but singled out by Blofeld for a lecture to throw Borraud off guard
 Maslov – "Number 18", formerly known as Kandinsky; a Polish electronics expert who resigned from Philips AG
 Kotze – "Number 5", formerly known as Emil Traut; an East German physicist who defected to the West
 Strelik – "Number 10", a former SMERSH member; shot dead by Largo for questioning the loyalty of the other SPECTRE members
 "Number 11" – Another ex-SMERSH operative
 Count Lippe – "Sub-operator G"; expected to send the Thunderball ransom letter, but his fight with Bond and subsequent injuries led to a delay in the plan.
 "Number 6" – Kills Lippe at the behest of Blofeld for being unreliable
 "Number 14" – A former Gestapo officer
 "Number 17" – Finds Domino scanning the Disco Volante with a Geiger counter in search of the stolen atomic bombs; reports her to Largo, who takes her prisoner and tortures her.
 Irma Bunt – Henchwoman in the novel and film On Her Majesty's Secret Service
 Black Dragon Society
This is only a brief description of the numbers of each member. In the first book to include SPECTRE, Thunderball, it is stated that the numbers of each member changes periodically (it "advances round a rota by two digits at midnight on the first of every month") to avoid detection and Blofeld is in fact "Number 2".

Operatives (Original Continuity)
 By order of appearance and fate
 Mr. Jones (Dr. No) – takes his own life with cyanide capsule in cigarette.
 Professor R. J. Dent (Dr. No) – shot by James Bond.
 Miss Taro (Dr. No) – arrested by Jamaican police.
 Dr. Julius No (Dr. No) – boiled alive in his own nuclear reactor.
 Donald "Red" Grant (From Russia with Love) – stabbed and garrotted by Bond.
 Morzeny (From Russia with Love) – burned in boating accident.
 Tov Kronsteen (No. 5, From Russia with Love) – killed on Blofeld's orders by Morzeny with poisoned stabbing shoe.
 Colonel Rosa Klebb (No. 3, From Russia with Love) – shot dead by Tatiana Romanova.
 Colonel Jaques Bouvar (No. 6, Thunderball) – killed by James Bond.
 Emilio Largo (No. 2, Thunderball) – shot with a speargun by Domino Derval.
 Fiona Volpe (Thunderball) – accidentally shot dead by her henchmen as they try to kill Bond.
 Number 9 (Thunderball) – electrocuted by Blofeld for embezzling from Spectre.
 Number 11 (Thunderball) – at large.
 Count Lippe (Thunderball) – killed by Volpe on Blofeld's orders.
 Angelo Palazzi (Thunderball) – killed by Largo on Blofeld's orders.
 Vargas (Thunderball) – killed with a speargun by James Bond.
 Janni (Thunderball) – killed when Largo's yacht explodes.
 Professor Ladislav Kutze (Thunderball, defected) – last seen jumping into ocean with lifebuoy.
 Quist (Thunderball) – thrown by Largo into shark pool.
 Helga Brandt (No.11, You Only Live Twice) – killed in piranha pool by Blofeld for failing to kill Bond.
 Hans (You Only Live Twice) – thrown into piranha pool by Bond.
 Mr. Osato (Head of Osato Chemicals, You Only Live Twice) – shot and killed as "the price of failure" by Blofeld.
 Number 3 (You Only Live Twice) – blown up in volcano explosion.
 Number 4 (You Only Live Twice) – fate unknown.
 Irma Bunt (On Her Majesty's Secret Service) – fate unknown.
 Grunther (On Her Majesty's Secret Service) – killed by Tracy Bond.
 Mr. Wint & Mr. Kidd (Diamonds Are Forever ) – Wint killed by Bond with a bomb, Kidd set on fire by Bond and jumps overboard to his death from ocean liner.
 Bert Saxby (Diamonds Are Forever) – shot and killed by CIA Agents.

By hierarchy

Operatives (Rebooted Continuity)
Franz Oberhauser / Ernst Stavro Blofeld – the mastermind behind Spectre and its subsidiary Quantum. Attempts to secure a monopoly on the "Nine Eyes" global intelligence initiative and establish Spectre as a supra-national world power. Taken into custody after Bond shoots down his helicopter.
Mr. White – high ranking Spectre agent and supervisor of Quantum. Acts as representative between Obanno and Le Chiffre. Kills Le Chiffre and is implied to have killed other failed agents. Grows disenchanted with Spectre, and is poisoned with thallium. Commits suicide after betraying Blofeld to 007 in exchange for his daughter's safety.
Le Chiffre – though not a Spectre member, he was a private banker to major terrorists who are introduced through Spectre, until Mr. White executes him with a shot in the head.
Kratt – Le Chiffre's right-hand man. Presumably killed by Mr. White.
Valenka – Le Chiffre's girlfriend. Presumably killed by Mr. White.
Leo – henchman of Le Chiffre. Arrested after being framed for the deaths of Steven Obanno and Obanno's bodyguard.
Steven Obanno – high-ranking member of Lord's Resistance Army who had ties to Spectre through Mr. White.  Entrusted his money to Le Chiffre, who lost it and was forced to organise a high stakes poker tournament in Montenegro to recoup his losses. Strangled by Bond.
Alex Dimitrios – a Greek terrorist associated with Le Chiffre who employs two bombers: first Mollaka then Carlos to explode the prototype plane of Skyfleet on the behalf of Le Chiffre. Stabbed with a knife by Bond
Mollaka – a bomb maker from Madagascar employed by Dimitrios to explode the Skyfleet plane. Shot by Bond before starting his mission.
Carlos – a bomb maker employed by Dimitrios to replace Mollaka in the attack on the Skyfleet plane. Accidentally blows himself up after Bond puts the bomb destined for the plane onto Carlos' belt.  
Adolph Gettler – a Spectre operative acting as Vesper Lynd's handler; Mr. White's second-in-command. Shot in the eye with a nail gun by Bond.
Craig Mitchell – an undercover Spectre operative placed inside MI6 who deceived both M and Bond. Shot by Bond.
Vesper Lynd – Blackmailed by Mr. White to embezzle Bond's winnings. Drowned herself.
Dominic Greene – leader of Quantum's Tierra Project and a major official in the organisation. Ran an environmentalist corporation called Greene Planet. Assassinated for betraying Quantum.
Edmund Slate – a freelance assassin hired by Greene to murder Camille Montes. Stabbed in the neck and then the leg with scissors by Bond.
Elvis – Greene's main subordinate. Blown up by Bond.
Greene's driver – a Quantum operative who served as Greene's chauffeur and bodyguard. Shot by Bond.
General Medrano – an exiled Bolivian dictator who associates with Dominic Greene to come back to power in Bolivia in exchange of a piece of land in the Atacama desert rich in water that will allow Quantum to have the monopoly of the water and sell it to Bolivia at twice the market price. Shot by Camille Montes.
Lieutenant Orso – lieutenant to General Medrano. Falls to his death of the top floor of the Eco Hotel when pushed by Camille Montes.
Carlos – the chief of the Bolivian Military Police and a friend of René Mathis who betrays him and has him killed on the orders of Greene and Medrano. He is killed with a shot in the head by Bond as revenge for betraying Mathis.
Yusef Kabira – a Quantum operative who functions as a honeypot to deceive foreign intelligence agents. Arrested by MI6.
Guy Haines – Quantum leader, is a special envoy of the Prime Minister and is one of the PM's most trusted advisers. Is a member of the Quantum identified by Tanner using Bond's photos from the opera Tosca. Still at large.
Gregor Karakov – Quantum leader, a former politician, owner of several mines in Siberia, is a member of the Quantum identified by Tanner using Bond's photos from the opera Tosca. Still at large.
Moishe Soref – Quantum leader, former Mossad agent, and Telecom giant. Is a member of the Quantum identified by Tanner using Bond's photos from the opera Tosca. Still at large.
Raoul Silva – an MI6 agent turned cyberterrorist. With support from the organisation and Blofeld, attempts to gain personal revenge on M for her betrayal. Indirectly succeeds, but is stabbed in the back by Bond before M dies.
Severine – the mistress of Raoul Silva who works for him by fear and tries to be free from him by sending Bond in his pursuit in hopes that Bond kills Silva. She is executed with a shot in the head by Silva for her treason.
Patrice – a mercenary for hire that is employed by Raoul Silva to steal the drive with the identities of the MI6 cover agents in the NATO missions around the world. Falls to his death from the top of a building after a fight with Bond.
Max Denbigh / C – a Whitehall government bureaucrat appointed as the director of the Joint Intelligence Service and the driving force behind the Nine Eyes program, but is secretly passing intelligence on to Spectre. Falls to his death while trying to avoid arrest.
Mr. Hinx – an assassin and high-ranking member of Spectre. Pursues Bond and Madeleine Swann. Thrown out of a moving train by Bond with a chain around his neck, presumed dead.
Marco Sciarra – a Spectre assassin co-ordinating terrorist attacks around the world. Thrown out of a helicopter by Bond.
Moreau – Spectre member, seen during the Rome meeting informing other members about Spectre involvement in distribution of illegal drugs. Still at large.
Guerra – Spectre member, seen during the Rome meeting who volunteers to replace Marco Sciarra in the chase for Mr. White. He is killed by Mr. Hinx to have the assignment of the mission.
Dr Vogel – Spectre member, seen during the Rome meeting. Killed by Heracles during the Cuba Spectre meeting.
Lorenzo – One of Spectre's guards seen during the Rome meeting. Thrown to his death by Bond from a balcony onto a large meeting table.
Marco – One of Lucia Sciarra's bodyguards who secretly works for Spectre with orders to kill her. Shot in the head by Bond.
Lyutsifer Safin - A Spectre chemist and assassin who defected sometime before Blofeld's imprisonment. Sometime later, Safin is able to create a terrorist organization which is strong enough to outsmart and annihilate Spectre.
Primo - A Spectre assassin who defected and joined Safin's group after the latter massacred all members of Spectre.

Non-EON
 Maximillian Largo (No. 1, Never Say Never Again)
 Fatima Blush (No. 12, Never Say Never Again)
 Eva Adara (From Russia with Love video game)

Acronym in the rest of world
 Italy: SPeciale Esecutivo per Controspionaggio, Terrorismo, Ritorsioni e Estorsioni (in English: SPecial Executive for Counter-intelligence, Terrorism, Retaliation and Extortion, because "revenge" in Italian is translated "vendetta").
 In some Italian movies, the organisation is called SuPremo Esecutivo per Controspionaggio, Terrorismo, Vendette ed Estorsioni (in English: SuPreme Executive for Counter-intelligence, Terrorism, Revenges and Extortion), but is called anyway "SPECTRE".
 Spain: Sociedad Permanente Ejecutiva para el Contraespionaje, Terrorismo, Rebeldía y Aniquilamiento (in English: Permanent Executive Society for Counter-intelligence, Terrorism, Rebellion and Annihilation, the abbreviation changes the last letter in Spanish language)
 France: Service pour l'espionnage, le contre-espionnage, le terrorisme, la rétorsion et l'extorsion (in English: Service for Espionage, Counter-intelligence, Terrorism, Retaliation, and Extortion) – incidentally, the French word spectre means "ghost".

Parodies and clones

SPECTRE is often parodied in films, video games, and novels. Well known examples are THRUSH and KAOS from The Man from U.N.C.L.E. and Get Smart.  The most obvious is the Austin Powers series of films. In this, a man named Dr. Evil (a parody of Ernst Stavro Blofeld) is the leader of a villainous organisation called Virtucon. Dr. Evil's second in command, known only as "Number Two", is a parody of Emilio Largo, Blofeld's second in command.
The Belgian comics series Spirou & Fantasio features an international criminal organisation called the Triangle whose members also address each other by numbers.
Prior to Dr. No, The Road to Hong Kong featured a "third force" organisation the Third Echelon.
In the video game series No One Lives Forever a man simply called "The director" leads a similar organisation called "H.A.R.M.". A running joke during the series is that no one actually knows what H.A.R.M. stands for. H.A.R.M may jokingly refer to Human Aetiological Relations Machine, the name of a fictional intelligence agency featured in the 1960s spy film Agent for H.A.R.M..
The TV series The Man from U.N.C.L.E. had, as its adversary, a shadowy organisation known as THRUSH (the Terrestrial Hegemony for the Removal of Undesirables and the Subjugation of Humankind). THRUSH (which, in the novels, stood for "Technological Hierarchy for Removal of Undesirables and Subjugation of Humanity") was opposed by the titular organization.
The TV series Rambo: the Force of Freedom featured a neo-Nazi organisation known as SAVAGE (Specialist-Administrators of Vengeance, Anarchy, and Global Extortion).  
The James Bond spin-off animated series, James Bond Jr., featured a clone of SPECTRE called "S.C.U.M." (Saboteurs and Criminals United in Mayhem), headed by a mysterious individual known as "Scumlord".
The animated series Inspector Gadget featured a clone of SPECTRE called "M.A.D." (Malevolent Agency of Destruction). Dr. Claw, the head of M.A.D., is also based on the villain Blofeld.
The Mexican films Chabelo y Pepito vs los Monstruos (Chabelo and Pepito vs the Monsters) and Chabelo y Pepito Detectives feature a criminal organisation named S.P.E.C.T.R.U.M., which carries two plans to dominate the world. In "Vs the Monsters", they extract uranium from a hill in the Mexican countryside, while in "Detectives" they sell toys that hypnotise children to make them work for them.
The young adult book series Micro Adventure featured a shady organisation known as BRUTE (the Bureau for Revenge and Universal TErrorism). Its adversary was ACT (the American Counterintelligence Taskforce).
 An organisation known as SCORPIA (Sabotage, CORruPtion, Intelligence, and Assassination) appears in the Alex Rider series of novels as recurring antagonists whose various members clash with the title character Alex Rider. Near the end of the Cold War, several secret agents and law enforcers abandoned their loyalty to their countries, and became effectively criminals for hire. Their actions range from supplying biological weapons to engineering terrorism and performing assassinations. They are defeated in the novel Scorpia Rising and replaced in the novel Nightshade by an organization reminiscent of the rebooted James Bond movie continuity's Spectre.
The TV series Lancelot Link: Secret Chimp featured a shadowy organisation called CHUMP (Unionized Hierarchy for Money, Power, and Control). It was opposed by APE (the Agency of Protection and Enforcement).
The TV series Get Smart featured a SPECTRE-like organisation called KAOS.
In 1983, a highly successful tabletop RPG called "James Bond 007: Role-Playing In Her Majesty's Secret Service" was released. With the novels and films as inspirations, the stories were adapted for players. Minor changes to plots and villains were made; for example, Wint and Kidd were freelance assassins working for SPECTRE. They in fact leased out services to other terrorist organisations and various crime syndicates. The most noted changes were to SPECTRE: Blofeld's name was changed to Karl Ferenc Skorpios, and he was given a greyhound instead of a white cat; the organisation itself was renamed TAROT (Terrestrial Acquisition and Revenge via Orchestrated Turmoil), with the face cards representing various departments. This was due to the copyright issues referenced above. Victory Games worked with EON productions (the film producers) for the rights to Bond, and were told they were not allowed to negotiate with McClory for the rights to SPECTRE, hence the hasty renaming.
The Disney animated series Darkwing Duck featured a masked crimefighter who often worked with an agency called S.H.U.S.H. (expanded name unknown) against the forces of F.O.W.L. (the Fiendish Organization of World Larceny). These organizations also featured in DuckTales reboot. In Season 3 of this show F.O.W.L. portrayed as the main villains of McDuck family, and its leader and founder, Bradford Buzzard, resembling leader of SPECTRE, Ernst Stavro Blofeld.
The THUNDER Agents comic featured an enemy called S.P.I.D.E.R. (Secret People's International Directorate for Extralegal Revenue).
The Galaxy organisation features in Our Man Flint where "Agent 0008" tells Flint that Galaxy is "bigger than SPECTRE".
Tom Clancy's novel Rainbow Six features a terrorist organisation that the characters compare to SPECTRE once they learn that the terrorists are using chemical warfare similar to that in On Her Majesty's Secret Service.
The video game Evil Genius places the player in command of a SPECTRE-like organisation, complete with a rocket-launching base inside a volcano. Additionally, one of the player's choices of leader (Maximilian) is almost identical in appearance to SPECTRE's leader, Ernst Stavro Blofeld (as he appeared in You Only Live Twice).
In the British television series The Secret Show the evil organisation T.H.E.M. (The Horrible Evil Menace) is similar to SPECTRE.
The CBBC series MI High features the criminal organisation "SKUL" (Super Kriminal Underground League), led by a man known only as "The Grandmaster" who is always seen stroking a white rabbit called General Flopsy.
The Spanish comic book Mortadelo y Filemón features a parody of SPECTRE called ABUELA (Agentes Bélicos Ultramarinos Especialistas en Líos Aberrantes – warlike agents overseas specialists in aberrant messes).
The Matt Helm films featured the Brotherhood of International Government and Order abbreviated as "BIG O".
Synthesiser company "Waldorf" has a synth named "Blofeld". The computer based "virtual editor" for the Blofeld is called "Spectre". One of Waldorf's virtual synths is called "Largo".
In the SpyDogs cartoon, the evil leader of cats, Katastrophe, always appears fondling a rubber mouse.
An evil organisation named STENCH (Society for the Total Extermination of Non-Conforming Humans) is featured in the film Carry On Spying.
James Earl Ray, who committed the assassination of Martin Luther King Jr. on April 4, 1968, used the alias Eric Starvo Galt during 1967, almost certainly a mixture of Ian Fleming and Ayn Rand.  "Ernst" and "Stavro" are peculiar sounds and spellings to American ears and eyes, and he mentally transposed them into "Eric" and "Starvo."
In The Simpsons episode "You Only Move Twice" appears an organisation called Globex Corporation directed by supervillain Hank Scorpio who successfully takes control of the East Coast.
The Marvel Universe has the organisations HYDRA and AIM, which are both opposed by Nick Fury and S.H.I.E.L.D., and are sometimes also opposed by Captain America and the other Marvel heroes, while the DC Universe came up with the organisation H.I.V.E. as an analogue to SPECTRE.
The Disney Channel's TV series Kim Possible has the organisation WEE (Worldwide Evil Empire), which is opposed by GJ (Global Justice) and Kim Possible herself at times.
In Spy Fox 2: "Some Assembly Required", Spy Fox battles LeRoach – a member of the Society of Meaningless Evil, Larceny, Lying and Yelling (S.M.E.L.L.Y.).
In Disney Channel's TV series Phineas and Ferb, Dr. Heinz Doofenshmirtz is occasionally seen as a member of the League Of Villainous Evildoers Maniacally United For Frightening Investments in Naughtiness (L.O.V.E.M.U.F.F.I.N.). Doofenshmirtz is not aware of the acronym until one of the other members points it out.
In an episode of Nickelodeon's TV series SpongeBob SquarePants, BarnacleBoy turns to the dark side and teams up with Man Ray and The Dirty Bubble and they form an alliance called Every Villain is Lemons (E.V.I.L.).
In the G.I. Joe toyline, cartoon and comic franchise, there exists an international terrorist organisation known as Cobra, which is similar to SPECTRE.
Dr Horrible's Sing-Along Blog features a supervillain organisation called the E.L.E. (Evil League of Evil), whose unseen leader Bad Horse is feared by all the members. The main protagonist of the film attempts to join the League, and eventually succeeds in doing so.
 The Japanese tokusatsu series Kamen Rider features a Nazi-connected terrorist group known as Shocker (eventually revealed as shorthand for  Sacred Hegemony Of Cycle Kindred Evolutionary Realm in the film reboot Kamen Rider The First). Employing a vast range of genetically-modified agents known as "modified humans" and henchmen known as Shocker Combatmen, the organisation was headed by a mysterious figure known as "The Great Leader" (played by Goro Naya) who mainly contacted his agents via voice (who is eventually revealed to be a hooded figure with two forms – a Medusa-inspired humanoid with a head covered by snakes and a cyclops). Shocker was eventually disbanded after one too many defeats at the hands of the show's protagonists and became known as Gel-Shocker after merging with an American criminal group known as Geldam. Gel-Shocker was eventually defeated as well, but subsequent entries of the franchise portrayed the Great Leader in various incarnations to lead various successor organizations, including Destron, Black Satan, the Delza Army, Neo-Shocker, the Badan Empire, Dai-Shocker (later reorganised into Super Shocker), and Space Shocker. The film Kamen Rider 1 also features a splinter group known as Nova Shocker. The Great Leader also claims to have been the driving force behind two separate terrorist groups known as the Government of Darkness (also known as GOD) and Geddon, though it has never been confirmed.
 The novel 19 by Roger Hall, published in 1970, is about an American unauthorised counter-intelligence group. Several regular intelligence services, though unsure if this rogue group actually exists, nicknamed it "19" because that number repeatedly came up, by apparent coincidence, in their investigations of what might have been 19's activities. When first told about 19 by a CIA friend, the narrator remarks that it sounds like SPECTRE gone straight (although it is misspelled "SPECTER" in 19). Rumor credits 19 with major roles in exposing Kim Philby and Rudolf Abel, among other achievements.

See also
List of James Bond villains

References

External links
 Blofeld from Demon.net
 spectreorganisation.com, information on Kevin McClory's fight for the rights to Thunderball and SPECTRE
007 SPECTRE Editorial Music Presentation at West Coast Midnight Run

James Bond organisations
Fictional organized crime groups
Fictional terrorist organizations
Fictional intelligence agencies
Literary villains
Fictional elements introduced in 1961
de:Figuren aus James-Bond-Filmen#Blofeld